Mark Anthony Yu Caguioa (born November 19, 1979) is a Filipino professional basketball player who last played for the Barangay Ginebra San Miguel of the Philippine Basketball Association (PBA). Known as The Spark and as MC47 from his initials and his jersey number, he is also half of "The Fast and The Furious", along with his backcourt partner, Jayjay Helterbrand.

Early life 
Caguioa was born and raised in the Philippines and spent his adolescent years in Eagle Rock, Los Angeles, California. In 1997, Caguioa graduated from Eagle Rock High School.

Collegiate career 
Caguioa played collegiate basketball at Glendale Community College. He was named to the First Team All-Western State Conference after the 1999–2000 season.

Professional career

Barangay Ginebra (2001–2020)
In 2001, Caguioa was drafted by the Barangay Ginebra Kings as the third overall pick. Expectations were not high as Caguioa started as a role player and backup for superstar Vergel Meneses. However, after showing strong performances and helping to lead the Kings to the 2001 All-Filipino Cup Finals, he became very popular. With his crossovers, drives to the basket, and penchant for making clutch plays, Caguioa earned the respect and admiration of the Filipino basketball fans. His exciting brand of play earned him the moniker "The Spark." At the end of his first season, Caguioa was the third Ginebra player, after Dondon Ampalayo in 1986 and Marlou Aquino in 1996, to win the Rookie of the Year award. For the 2011–2012 season, he won the Most Valuable Player award.

"The Fast and The Furious"
In the 2004–05 season, Caguioa, along with his backcourt partner Jayjay Helterbrand, formed a strong tandem, which was dubbed as "The Fast and The Furious". Their play enabled Ginebra to win back-to-back championships. Caguioa also set his then career high for points in a single game during that season, scoring 43 points (he later eclipsed this by scoring 45 points) in Game 4 of the Philippine Cup Finals against the Talk 'N Text Phone Pals.

In the 2006 Philippine Cup, Caguioa earned "Player of the Week" honors three times. He led the league in scoring at 24 points per game, and broke his previous career high for points in a single game, scoring 45 points in a losing effort against Red Bull in the quarterfinals. He became the first guard to finish a single season as the league's leading scorer since Allan Caidic in 1995.

In the 2007 Philippine Cup, Caguioa averaged 24.7 points per game in the 23 games he played. He also led the league in statistical points for the Best Player of the Conference Award. Caguioa piloted Ginebra to their seventh championship in franchise history by besting the San Miguel Beermen in a best-of-seven finals. During their series against Talk 'N Text in the semifinals, Caguioa scored 34, 31, 26, 35, and 31 points in the five games. Caguioa won the 2007 PBA Best Player of the Conference.

Caguioa again helped his team during the 2008 PBA Fiesta Conference, culminating in the team's eighth championship. He also led the league in scoring.

In the 2008–09 season, Caguioa failed to suit up for Kings due to his therapy in the United States for tendinitis on both knees.

Caguioa received the MVP award and back to back Best Player of the Conference awards in 2011 and 2012.

On October 5, 2018, against NLEX Road Warriors, Caguioa scores 16 points to join the PBA 10,000 points club.

PBA career statistics

As of the end of 2020 season

Season-by-season averages

|-
| align=left | 
| align=left | Barangay Ginebra
| 52 || 26.1 || .467 || .422 || .870 || 4.9 || 1.7 || 1.0 || .1 || 13.8
|-
| align=left | 
| align=left | Barangay Ginebra
| 30 || 29.5 || .438 || .333 || .865 || 4.2 || 2.3 || .6 || .0 || 13.3
|-
| align=left | 
| align=left | Barangay Ginebra
| 41 || 35.6 || .421 || .329 || .750 || 6.0 || 2.7 || 1.0 || .1 || 17.3
|-
| align=left | 
| align=left | Barangay Ginebra
| 78 || 37.4 || .491 || .331 || .799 || 6.3 || 3.1 || 1.1 || .1 || 18.7
|-
| align=left | 
| align=left | Barangay Ginebra
| 48 || 37.7 || .418 || .258 || .741 || 5.8 || 2.5 || 1.0 || .2 || 20.6
|-
| align=left | 
| align=left | Barangay Ginebra
| 30 || 38.7 || .425 || .329 || .738 || 4.9 || 4.4 || .9 || .2 || 24.6
|-
| align=left | 
| align=left | Barangay Ginebra
| 39 || 32.1 || .486 || .304 || .648 || 4.2 || 2.2 || .8 || .1 || 19.8
|-
| align=left | 
| align=left | Barangay Ginebra
| 34 || 22.7 || .428 || .225 || .785 || 3.1 || 1.6 || .9 || .0 || 11.9
|-
| align=left | 
| align=left | Barangay Ginebra
| 57 || 28.7 || .418 || .310 || .759 || 5.3 || 2.4 || .7 || .0 || 16.0
|-
| align=left | 
| align=left | Barangay Ginebra
| 41 || 30.6 || .397 || .330 || .760 || 4.8 || 2.3 || .8 || .1 || 16.3
|-
| align=left | 
| align=left | Barangay Ginebra
| 41 || 32.1 || .402 || .283 || .728 || 4.5 || 2.6 || .7 || .0 || 17.2
|-
| align=left | 
| align=left | Barangay Ginebra
| 43 || 26.7 || .416 || .360 || .806 || 4.1 || 2.0 || .3 || .2 || 10.6
|-
| align=left | 
| align=left | Barangay Ginebra
| 33 || 25.8 || .411 || .217 || .863 || 3.8 || 1.9 || .6 || .1 || 9.8
|-
| align=left | 
| align=left | Barangay Ginebra
| 49 || 21.9 || .392 || .102 || .800 || 3.3 || 1.8 || .6 || .1 || 7.0
|-
| align=left | 
| align=left | Barangay Ginebra
| 59 || 10.7 || .418 || .083 || .949 || 2.5 || .7 || .2 || .1 || 4.4
|-
| align=left | 
| align=left | Barangay Ginebra
| 43 || 9.6 || .428 || .167 || .579 || 2.3 || .4 || .2 || .1 || 3.6
|-
| align=left | 
| align=left | Barangay Ginebra
| 23 || 7.6 || .433 || .333 || .733 || 1.3 || .5 || .2 || .0 || 2.8
|-
| align=left | 
| align=left | Barangay Ginebra
| 3 || 6.4 || .667 || – || – || 2.3 || .7 || .0 || .0 || 1.3
|-class=sortbottom
| align="center" colspan="2" | Career
| 744 || 27.1 || .434 || .307 || .765 || 4.4 || 2.1 || .7 || .1 || 13.5
|}

National team career
Caguioa was named in the RP Training Pool for future international competitions. He participated in several exhibition games against the Iranian National Team and the NBL's Sydney Kings in mid-2005, where he impressed the latter team's coach by scoring 27 points. He has also played in the 2005 FIBA Asia Champions Cup held in the Philippines, in which his team finished fifth. He averaged 19.8 points and 3.4 rebounds per game in that tournament.

However, Caguioa was eventually dropped from the team. National mentor Chot Reyes claimed that Caguioa had failed to appear for several practice sessions.

In 2007, he joined the national team that won the SEABA Championship with a perfect record and finished ninth place with a record of 5–2 in the 2007 FIBA Asia Championship.

References

1979 births
Living people
Barangay Ginebra San Miguel draft picks
Barangay Ginebra San Miguel players
Basketball players from Metro Manila
Filipino emigrants to the United States
Filipino men's basketball players
Glendale Vaqueros men's basketball players
People from San Juan, Metro Manila
Philippine Basketball Association All-Stars
Philippines men's national basketball team players
Shooting guards